Sydney Lanchaster Sarel (18 June 1872 – 23 December 1950) was a British track and field athlete who competed in racewalking events. At the 1908 Summer Olympics he was eliminated in the first round of the 3500 metre walk competition.

He dedicated himself to missionary work and also the promotion of athletics. He was the president of London Athletic Club in 1928.

References

External links
Profile from British Olympic Association
Sydney Sarel. Sports Reference. Retrieved on 2015-01-25.

1872 births
1950 deaths
British male racewalkers
English male racewalkers
Olympic athletes of Great Britain
Athletes (track and field) at the 1908 Summer Olympics
People from the Royal Borough of Kensington and Chelsea
Athletes from London
Athletics (track and field) administrators